Damudya is an upazila of Shariatpur District in the Division of Dhaka, Bangladesh. Damudya Thana was established in 1975 and was converted into an upazila in 1982. It is named after its administrative center, the town of Damudya.

Geography
It borders Bhedarganj Upazila to the north, Gosairhat Upazila to the east and south, Madaripur District to the west, and Shariatpur Sadar Upazila to the northwest.

Demographics

According to the 2011 Bangladesh census, Damudya Upazila had 24,193 households and a population of 109,003, 15.9% of whom lived in urban areas. 11.1% of the population was under the age of 5. The literacy rate (age 7 and over) was 52.5%, compared to the national average of 51.8%.

Administration
Damudya Upazila is divided into Damudya Municipality and seven union parishads: Darul Aman, Dhanokathi, Islampur, Koneshwar, Purbo Damudya, Shidul Kura, and Sidda. The union parishads are subdivided into 60 mauzas and 120 villages.

Damudya Municipality is subdivided into 9 wards and 11 mahallas.

Education

Purba Madari Pur College is the only college in the upazila.

The madrasa education system includes one kamil madrasa, the only one in the district.

See also
Upazilas of Bangladesh
Districts of Bangladesh
Divisions of Bangladesh

References

Upazilas of Shariatpur District